The Tennis Stadium is a stadium in the Olympiapark Berlin in Berlin, Germany. Located southwest of the Olympic Stadium in Olympiapark Berlin, it hosted the basketball competition for the 1936 Summer Olympics.

References
1936 Summer Olympics official report. Volume 1. pp. 162–3.

Venues of the 1936 Summer Olympics
Olympic basketball venues
Sports venues in Berlin
Tennis venues in Germany